Heavy chain may refer to:
Immunoglobulin heavy chain, a subunit of antibodies
Heavy-chain antibody, an antibody composed of heavy chains only
Heavy chain disease, a disease affecting antibody heavy chain production
Myosin heavy chain, a subunit of myosin II
Myosin-heavy-chain kinase, an enzyme that catalyses the phosphorylation of myosin heavy chains